DoDEA-Europe Bavaria District is a school district headquartered in Germany that includes DoDEA schools located in the southwestern German states of Bavaria and Baden-Württemberg

Schools
Ansbach Community 
Ansbach Elementary School
Ansbach Middle High School

Garmisch Community
Garmisch Elementary/Middle School

Grafenwoehr Community
Grafenwoehr Elementary School
Netzaberg Elementary School
Netzaberg Middle School
Vilseck Elementary School
Vilseck High School

Hohenfels Community
Hohenfels Elementary School
Hohenfels Middle/High School

Stuttgart Community
Patch Elementary School
Patch Middle School
Robinson Barracks Elementary School
Stuttgart Elementary School
Stuttgart High School

References

External links
 

Department of Defense Education Activity